In telecommunications, a fixed service (or fixed radiocommunication service) is a radiocommunication service between specified fixed points.

Classification
The ITU Radio Regulations (article 1) classify variations of this radiocommunication service as follows:
Fixed service
Fixed-satellite service (article 1.21); Fixed station (article 1.66)
Inter-satellite service (article 1.22)
Earth exploration-satellite service (article 1.51)
Meteorological-satellite service (article 1.52)

Examples 

In line with national regulations there are numerous radio applications in accordance with ITU RR article 1.20 on fixed services. These include:

 Radio relay 
 Troposcatter radiocommunication
 Embassy radiocommunication, between fixed point
 Fixed wireless

Frequency allocation
The allocation of radio frequencies is provided according to Article 5 of the ITU Radio Regulations (edition 2012).

In order to improve harmonisation in spectrum utilisation, the majority of service-allocations stipulated in this document were incorporated in national Tables of Frequency Allocations and Utilisations which is with-in the responsibility of the appropriate national administration. The allocation might be primary, secondary, exclusive, and shared.
primary allocation:  is indicated by writing in capital letters (see example below)
secondary allocation: is indicated by small letters
exclusive or shared utilization: is within the responsibility of administrations 
However, military usage, in bands where there is civil usage, will be in accordance with the ITU Radio Regulations. In NATO countries military fixed utilizations will be in accordance with NATO Joint Civil/Military Frequency Agreement (NJFA).

An example of frequency allocation in the 8.3–110 kHz range would be:

References 

 International Telecommunication Union (ITU)
 Earth exploration-satellite service. ITU, Genf 2011. 

Radiocommunication services ITU